The list of tardigrades of South Africa is a list of species that form a part of the phylum Tardigrada of the fauna of South Africa. The list follows the SANBI listing.

Where common names are given, they are not necessarily the only common names in use for the species.

Class Heterotardigrada

Order Echiniscoidea

Family Echiniscidae

Genus Echiniscus:
 Echiniscus africanus Murray, 1907	
 Echiniscus arctomys Ehrenberg, 1853	
 Echiniscus crassispinosus Murray, 1907	
 Echiniscus duboisi Richters, 1902	
 Echiniscus longispinosus Murray, 1907	
 Echlniscus perarmatus Murray, 1907	
 Echiuiscus pusae Marcus, 1928	

Genus Pseudechiniscus:
 Pseudechiniscus bispinosus (Murray, 1907)	
 Pseudechiniscus jiroveci Bartos, 1963	
 Pseudechiniscus suillus Ehrenberg, 1853), syn. Echiniscus mutabilis Murray, 1905, Pseudechiniscus suillus suillus (Ehrenberg, 1853)

Class Eutardigrada

Order Parachela

Family Hypsibiidae

Genus Doryphoribius:
 Doryphoribius flavus (Iharos, 1966), syn. Doryphoribius citrinus, (Maucci, 1972), Hypsibius citrinus Maucci, 1973

Genus Hypsibius:
 Hypsibius convergens (Urbanowicz, 1925), syn. Macrobiotus convergens Urbanowicz, 1925 
 Hypsibius dujardini (Doyère, 1840), syn. Hypsibius lacustris (Doyère, 1851), Macrobiotus dujardin Doyère, 1840, Macrobiotus dujardini Doyère, 1840, Macrobiotus samoanus Richters, 1908
 Hypsibius maculatus (Iharos, 1969)	

Genus Isohypsibius:
 Isohypsibius deconincki Pilato, 1971	
 Isohypsibius nodosus (Murray, 1907), syn. Hypsibius nodosus (Murray, 1907), Macrobiotus nodosus Murray, 1907
 Isohypsibius sattleri (Richters, 1902), syn. Hypsibius bakonyiensis Iharos, 1964, Hypsibius sattleri (Richters, 1902), Isohypsibius bakonyiensis (Iharos, 1964), Macrobiotus sattleri Richters, 1902

Genus Ramazzottius:
 Ramazzottius szeptycki (Dastych, 1980), syn. Hypsibius szeptycki Dastych, 1980, Ramazzottius szepticki (Dastych, 1980)
 Ramazzottius theroni Dastych, 1983

Genus Diphascon:
 Diphascon scoticum Murray, 1905, syn. Adropion scoticum Murray, 1905, Hypsibius scoticus (Murray, 1905)
 Diphascon zaniewi Kaczmarek & Michalczyk, 2004

Genus Paradiphascon:
 Paradiphascon manningi Dastych, 1992

Genus Astatumen:
 Astatumen trinacriae (Arcidiacono, 1962), syn. Astatumen ramazzottii (Iharos, 1966), Itaquascon ramazzottii Iharos, 1966, Itaquascon trinacriae Arcidiacono, 1962

Family Calohypsibiidae

Genus Haplomacrobiotus:
 Haplomacrobiotus seductor Pilato & Beasley, 1987

Family Macrobiotidae

Genus Calcarobiotus:
 Calcarobiotus filmeri Dastych, 1993 	
 Calcarobiotus occultus Dastych, 1993	

Genus Macrobiotus:
 Macrobiotus drakensbergi Dastych, 1993 	
 Macrobiotus echinogenitus Richters, 1904 	
 Macrobiotus furciger Murray, 1906, syn. Macrobiotus furciger Murray, 1907
 Macrobiotus hufelandi C.A.S. Schultze, 1834, syn. Macrobiotus eminens Ehrenberg, 1895, Macrobiotus hufelandii C.A.S. Schultze, 1834, Macrobiotus interruptus Della Valle, 1914
 Macrobiotus nuragicus Pilato & Sperlinga, 1975 	
 Macrobiotus richtersi Murray, 1911 	
 Macrobiotus iharosi Pilato, Binda & Catanzaro, 1991	
 Macrobiotus crassidens (Murray, 1907)

Genus Minibiotus:
 Minibiotus hufelandioides (Murray, 1910), syn. Macrobiotus hufelandioides Murray, 1910 
 Minibiotus intermedius  (Plate, 1888), syn. Macrobiotus intermedius Plate, 1889, Macrobiotus intermedius intermedius]] Plate, 1889

Order Apochela

Family Milnesiidae

Genus Milnesium:
 Milnesium tardigradum Doyère, 1840, syn. Arcrophanes schlagintweitii Ehrenberg, 1859, Arctiscon tardigradum Schrank, 1803

References

Biodiversity of South Africa
Tardigrades
Lists of invertebrates